Cheng Chung-tai (born 5 November 1983) is a Hong Kong academic, social activist, and politician. After winning a seat in the New Territories West constituency in the 2016 legislative election, he took over from Wong Yeung-tat as chairman of Civic Passion until the dissolution in 2021.

Until being disqualified in August 2021, he was the only opposition member in the Legislative Council amid the mass resignation of pro-democracy legislators.

Biography
Cheng was born in 1983 in Hong Kong. His grandfather was an immigrant from Zhongshan, Guangdong in the Mainland. He obtained his bachelor's degree from Hong Kong Polytechnic University and doctoral degree from Peking University.

He was a member of the localist group Civic Passion and participated in the anti-parallel trading protests in 2015. In the 2015 local election, Cheng represented Civic Passion to run against pro-democratic Democratic Party incumbent Albert Ho in Lok Tsui, where he secured 391 votes, while Ho lost his seat to pro-Beijing candidate Junius Ho by a margin of 277 votes.

In the 2016 Hong Kong Legislative Council election, Cheng represented Civic Passion to run in the New Territories West. He took over Wong Yeung-tat's position as the leader of Civic Passion after his electoral victory.

On 5 January 2017, Cheng declared that Civic Passion would no longer participate in street protests and instead reorient itself to focusing on community work, and to restructure as a political party. As reasons for this step, he cited the risks – several Civic Passion members had been arrested for their involvement in the 2016 Mong Kok civil unrest almost a year earlier –, as well as his view that current public opinion was not supportive enough of street protests.

In September 2017, Cheng was convicted and fined for the offence of flag desecration. In October 2016, he had flipped upside down some miniature Chinese and Hong Kong flags,  which legislator Edward Lau had handed out to legislators of the Legislative Council. Lau stated in his testimony that his intention had been to remind legislators that the country should be respected. Cheng regarded the flags as "cheap patriotic acts" and alleged that the pro-Beijing bloc was ignoring issues of actual importance to Hong Kong people. Lau subsequently called the police to report Cheng for flag desecration. On 29 September 2017, the Eastern Magistrates' Court found Cheng guilty and fined him . Lau subsequently stated that the punishment was light, and referred to previous sentences of imprisonment for burning and scrawling on the flag.

On 31 August 2019, Cheng was one of several prominent democrats targeted in sweeping arrests made by police that day.

In November 2020, pro-democracy Legislative Council members resigned en masse to protest against the latest action by the Chinese Government, leaving Cheng the sole opposition legislator; and along with nonpartisan Pierre Chan, one of the two non-pro-Beijing members.

Cheng lost his Legislative Council seat on 26 August 2021 after he was disqualified of his ex-officio member in the Election Committee, which would be mandated to elect new Chief Executive, as the authorities deemed Cheng "unpatriotic".

Academic career
From 2012 to 2018, Cheng has served as a teaching fellow at the Department of Applied Social Sciences at the Hong Kong Polytechnic University. He teaches classes on Hong Kong society, Chinese society, and popular culture.

In 2016, he was criticised by Kaizer Lau, a member of the governing council of the Hong Kong Polytechnic University for supporting and organising violent protests and advocating for Hong Kong independence. Lau also called for the non-renewal of the employment contract of Cheng.

Cheng lost this position on 30 June 2018 as his teaching contract had not been renewed by the university. He quoted a disciplinary letter from the university as stating: "Your conduct and convictions are inconsistent with the university’s commitment to quality education and aspiration to embrace internationalisation". He alleged that the university's actions were "political persecution" and were unrelated to his teaching performance.

See also
Hong Kong Autonomy Movement

References

1983 births
Alumni of the Hong Kong Polytechnic University
Peking University alumni
Living people
Academic staff of Hong Kong Polytechnic University
Hong Kong activists
Civic Passion politicians
HK LegCo Members 2016–2021